Rumo (Rum in local dialect) is a comune (municipality) in Trentino in the northern Italian region Trentino-Alto Adige/Südtirol, located about  north of Trento.

Rumo borders the following municipalities: Ulten, Proveis, Bresimo, Cagnò, Revò and Livo.

Demographic evolution

References

Cities and towns in Trentino-Alto Adige/Südtirol